The 2014 Tulsa Golden Hurricane football team represented the University of Tulsa in the 2014 NCAA Division I FBS football season. They were led by fourth-year head coach Bill Blankenship and played their home games at Skelly Field at H. A. Chapman Stadium. They were first year members of the American Athletic Conference. They finished the season 2–10 overall and 2–6 in conference play to finish in a tie for eighth place.

Blankenship was fired at the end of the season. He finished with a four-year record of 24–27.

Schedule

Game summaries

Tulane

Oklahoma

at Florida Atlantic

Texas State

at Colorado State

at Temple

South Florida

at Memphis

SMU

at Central Florida

at Houston

East Carolina

References

Tulsa
Tulsa Golden Hurricane football seasons
Tulsa Golden Hurricane football